Mr. California may refer to:

 Mr. California Clothing, Leisurewear for men
 Rockwell D. Hunt, named "Mr. California" by Governor Goodwin Knight in 1954